The Jivamukti Yoga method is a proprietary style of yoga created by David Life and Sharon Gannon in 1984.

Jivamukti is a physical, ethical, and spiritual practice, combining a vigorous yoga as exercise, vinyasa-based physical style with adherence to five central tenets: shastra (scripture), bhakti (devotion), ahimsā (nonviolence, non-harming), nāda (music), and dhyana (meditation). It also emphasizes animal rights, veganism, environmentalism, and social activism.

History

Jivamukti Yoga was co-founded in New York in 1984 by dancer and musician Sharon Gannon and her partner, artist and cafe owner David Life. Gannon and Life met in 1982 in Manhattan. In 1986 they traveled together to India and took the Sivananda teacher training program and met Swami Nirmalananda. Upon their return, they opened the first Jivamukti Yoga Society in the East Village of New York City. In 1990 they began to practice Ashtanga Yoga with Pattabhi Jois in Mysore, India. In 1993, in upstate New York, they met yoga scholar and ashram founder Shri Brahmananda Sarasvati (Yogi Mishra). In 1998, having become "wildly successful", the yoga center moved to a  studio on Lafayette Street; some 400 people subscribed, annual membership at that time costing $1200, rather more than a typical gym. The journalist and author Stefanie Syman ascribes Jivamukti's "surprisingly profitabile" business with its merger of "overt spirituality, the chanting, the deities, and the sacred music and vigorous asana classes" to the culture at that moment in history, comparable to America of the late 1910s and early 1920s. In 2000, Jivamukti opened a second center on the Upper East Side. In 2003, senior Jivamukti students Patrick Broome and Gabriela Bozic opened Jivamukti Munich, the first Jivamukti Yoga Center outside of New York City. In 2006, the Jivamukti Yoga School NYC relocated their main headquarters to an environmentally constructed studio in Union Square. Jivamukti Yoga has developed a reputation as the chosen yoga style of many celebrities.

The name Jivamukti is an adaptation of the Sanskrit जीवन्मुक्ति jivanmuktih, where jiva is the individual living soul, and mukti – like moksa – is liberation from the cycle of death and rebirth. Thus the Jivamukti method is "liberation while living".

Main tenets
There are five main tenets of the Jivamukti method. These are Shastra, Bhakti, Ahimsa, Nāda, and Dhyana.

Shastra

Shastra, or scripture, is the study and exploration of the four central texts of yoga and of the Sanskrit language in which they were written. The four texts are the Yoga Sutras of Patanjali, the Hatha Yoga Pradipika, the Bhagavad Gita, and the Upanishads.

Bhakti

Bhakti, "devotion to God", is the practice of devotion and humility. Jivamukti Yoga holds that "God-realization" is the goal of yoga practice, and that it does not matter to what form of God one's love and devotion is directed; what matters is that the devotion should be directed to something higher than one's own self or ego.

Ahimsa

Ahimsa is the practice of nonviolence, or non-harming. Ahimsa is informed by compassion, and is defined in Patanjali's Yoga Sutra as the first of five yamas. Yamas define the measure of how the yogi relates to other people and to the external world. The Jivamukti method teaches that the practice of ahimsa extends not only to other humans but to all animal life and advocates ethical vegetarianism both as a means of resolving human karma and as an environmental imperative for the future health of the planet.

Nāda

Nāda yoga centers on deep inner listening, chanting, and elevated music. Its theoretical and practical aspects are based on the premise that everything that exists, including human beings, consists of sound vibrations, called nāda. 

Contrary to many other schools of yoga, Jivamukti teachers generally do not do the postures while they teach a class. This encourages students to learn by listening, rather than by watching, and in this way develop their ability to listen effectively. Sharon Gannon summarizes the intention of this approach as follows: “Through listening, hearing arises, through hearing knowing, through knowing becoming, by becoming being is possible.”

Dhyana

Dhyana, or meditation, as taught in the Jivamukti method is the practice of being still and watching one's own mind think. This practice is intended to enable a person to cease to identify with their thoughts and realize that they are more than their thoughts. All Jivamukti Yoga classes include a meditation practice.

Books

 Jivamukti Yoga: Practices for Liberating Body and Soul (Sharon Gannon, David Life; 2002)
 The Art of Yoga (Sharon Gannon, David Life, Martin Brading; 2002)
 Yoga and Vegetarianism: The Diet of Enlightenment (Sharon Gannon; 2008)
 "Yoga Assists: A Complete Visual & Inspirational Guide To Yoga Asana Assists" (Sharon Gannon, David Life; 2012)
 Simple Recipes for Joy (Sharon Gannon) 
 The Magic 10 and Beyond (Sharon Gannon)

Centers

There are main centers in the United States, Germany, Spain, Norway, Australia, Russia, and Mexico, and affiliate centers in several other countries. In 2003, the Jivamukti Yoga School NYC established a 125-acre nature preserve in the Catskill Mountains, near Woodstock, New York. Known as the Wild Woodstock Jivamukti Forest Sanctuary, it serves as the country ashram for the Jivamukti Yoga School and a safe haven and unpolluted habitat for diverse plant and animal species.

To teach the Jivamukti Yoga method in one of its centers, an instructor is required to go through rigorous yoga teacher training and to pass a series of examinations.

Controversies 
In 2016, accusations of sexual harassment were made public against one of Jivamukti Yoga School's most senior teachers, Ruth Lauer-Manenti, by one of her female students. The student filed a lawsuit, which has since been settled for an undisclosed amount. Author and blogger Michelle Goldberg questioned in Slate magazine whether Jivamukti is a workplace, an ashram, or a cult, with a culture of spiritual abuse and secrecy.

The author and yoga teacher Matthew Remski reported, based on interviews with former employees of Jivamukti, that Jivamukti Yoga School NYC used non-disclosure agreements to "smooth over student grievances against teachers, or teacher’s [sic] grievances against management", and to prevent former students and employees from discussing the school’s culture. In exchange, Remski writes, departing personnel and students received cash payments or tuition refunds.

References

Sources

External links
 Jivamukti Yoga School
 Sharon Gannon explains the five tenets of Jivamukti Yoga

Modern Denominational Yoga
Yoga schools
Yoga styles